The discography for the Australian rock band The Screaming Jets.

Albums

Studio albums

Live albums

Compilation albums

Extended plays

Singles

Notes

References

Screaming Jets, The
Rock music group discographies